List of esports events in 2020 (also known as professional gaming). Several events have been cancelled due to the COVID-19 pandemic, and some organizers opted to continue running tournaments remotely through the internet.

Calendar of events

Tournaments

References

 
Esports by year